Yazılar is a village in the Mudurnu District of Bolu Province in Turkey. Its population is 298 (2021).

References

Villages in Mudurnu District